The Programa de Aceleração do Crescimento (Growth Acceleration Program), better known as PAC, is a major infrastructure program of the Federal government of Brazil. The program was launched on January 28, 2007, by the Lula da Silva administration, consisting of a set of economic policies and investment projects with the objective of accelerating economic growth in Brazil. The program had a budget of $503.9 billion reais for the 2007-2010 quadriennium. The Rousseff administration has continued the program under the name PAC-2.

Program structure

The Growth Acceleration Program forecasts investments by the Federal government, state enterprises and the private sector in construction, sanitation, energy, transport and logistics. The program had an estimated budget of $503.9 billion reais for the 2007–2010 quadriennium.

PAC 2 
PAC 2 was launched in March 2010 by President Dilma Rousseff. It was set up as a continuation of the original PAC, which was designed to last only four years. PAC 2 had a budget of R$1.59 trillion, and focused on the development of social and infrastructure sectors such as transportation, energy, health care, culture, and housing.

See also
Avança Brasil

References

External links
Official website 

Public finance of Brazil
Government agencies of Brazil
Luiz Inácio Lula da Silva